Rebecca L. Dow (born June 26, 1973) is an American politician who served as a member of the New Mexico House of Representatives for the 38th from 2017 to 2023. She was an unsuccessful candidate for the Republican nomination in the 2022 New Mexico gubernatorial election.

Dow earned an associate's degree from Tulsa Community College and a Bachelor of Science degree in business management from Oral Roberts University.

References

1973 births
Living people
Republican Party members of the New Mexico House of Representatives
Women state legislators in New Mexico
21st-century American politicians
21st-century American women politicians
Tulsa Community College alumni
Oral Roberts University alumni
Candidates in the 2022 United States elections